Dwarka is a city and a municipality of Devbhumi Dwarka district in the state of Gujarat in Western India. It is located on the western shore of the Okhamandal Peninsula on the right bank of the Gomti river at the mouth of the Gulf of Kutch facing the Arabian Sea. Often identified with the Dwarka Kingdom, described in the Bhagavata Purana as the ancient kingdom of Krishna and is believed to have been the first capital of Gujarat.  

Dwarka has the Dwarkadhish Temple dedicated to Krishna, which is one of four sacred Hindu pilgrimage sites collectively called the Chardham, which were founded by Adi Shankaracharya (686–717 AD) at the four corners of the country, was established as a monastic center and it forms part of the Dwarka temple complex. Dwarka is also one of the seven-most-ancient religious cities (Sapta Puri) in India.  

Dwarka is part of the "Krishna pilgrimage circuit" which includes Vrindavan, Mathura, Barsana, Gokul, Govardhan, Kurukshetra and Puri. It's one of 12 heritage cities across the country selected under the Heritage City Development and Augmentation Yojana (HRIDAY) scheme of the Government of India to develop civic infrastructure.

The city has a hot, arid climate with a 16-day rainy season. It had a population of 38,873 in 2011. The main festival of Krishna Janmashtami is celebrated in Bhadrapada (August–September).

History

Puranic traditions

Dwarka is believed to have been the first capital of Gujarat. The city's name literally means gateway. Dwarka has also been referred to throughout its history as "Mokshapuri", "Dwarkamati", and "Dwarkavati". It is mentioned in the ancient prehistoric epic period of the Mahabharata. According to legend, Krishna settled here after he defeated and killed his uncle Kamsa at Mathura. This mythological account of Krishna's migration to Dwarka from Mathura is closely associated with the culture of Gujarat.

Dwarka was established as the capital in Saurashtra by the Vedic Indians during the Puranaic. The Yadavas, who had migrated from Mathura, established their kingdom here when the city was known as "Kaushathali". It was during this period that the city underwent rebuilding and was named Dwarka. A friendly population of natives also prompted Krishna to settle at Dwarka when he decided, after fighting Jarasandha, the king of Magadha, to retreat from Mathura. The kingdom, also known as the Yaduvanshi empire, was established by Uugrasena, father of Kansa the then ruler and later Krishna flourished and extended its domain. It is said that Krishna conducted the administration of his kingdom from Dwarka while residing with his family in Bet Dwarka. The city's Dwarkadhish Temple dedicated to Krishna was originally built around 2,500 years ago, but was destroyed by Mahmud Begada rulers and subsequently rebuilt in the 16th century. The temple is also the location of Dwaraka maţha, also called Sharada Matha/Peeth and "western peeth", one of the four peeths (Sanskrit: "religious center") established by Adi Shankaracharya. As an important pilgrimage centre for Hindus, Dwarka has several notable temples, including Rukmini Devi Temple, Gomti Ghat, and Bet Dwarka. There is also a lighthouse at the land end point of Dwarka.

Archaeology
Archaeological investigations at Dwarka, both on shore and offshore in the Arabian Sea, have been performed by the Archaeological Survey of India. The first investigations carried out on land in 1963 revealed many artefacts. Excavations done at two sites on the seaward side of Dwarka brought to light submerged settlements, a large stone-built jetty, and triangular stone anchors with three holes. The settlements are in the form of exterior and interior walls, and fort bastions. From the typological classification of the anchors it is inferred that Dwarka had flourished as a port during the period of the Middle kingdoms of India. Coastal erosion was probably the cause of the destruction of what was an ancient port.

Dwarka is mentioned in the copper inscription dated 574 AD of Simhaditya, the Maitraka dynasty minister of Vallabhi. He was the son of Varahdas, the king of Dwarka. The nearby Bet Dwarka island is a religious pilgrimage site and an important archaeological site of the Late Harappan period, with one thermoluminescence date of 1570 BC.

Early history
An epigraphic reference ascribed to Garulaka Simhaditya, the son of Varahdas, the king of Dwarka, is inscribed on a copper plate dated to 574 AD, found in Palitana. The Greek writer of the Periplus of the Erythraean Sea referred to a place called Baraca, which has been interpreted as present-day Dwarka. A reference made in Ptolemy's Geography identified Barake as an island in the Gulf of Kanthils, which has also been inferred to mean Dwarka.

One of the four dhams (religious seats), which were founded by Adi Shankaracharya (686–717 AD) at the four corners of the country, was established as a monastic centre and it forms part of the Dwarka temple complex. In 885 AD, the temple was renovated by Nrushinhaashrma, head of the Shankaracharya pitha (centre).

Middle Ages to present
In 1241, Mohammad Shah invaded Dwarka and damaged the temple. During this battle, five Brahmins (Virajee Thakar, Nathu Thakar, Karasan Thakar, Valjee Thakar, and Devasee Thakar) fought against him, died, and were honoured as martyrs. A shrine was built near the temple in their honour and is known as "Panch Peer", which is a name of Muslim origin.

In 1473 the Gujarat Sultan Mahmud Begada sacked the city and destroyed the temple of Dwarka. The Jagat Mandir or the Dwarakadhisa temple was later rebuilt. Vallabha Acharya retrieved an idol of Dwarkadhish, which was revered by Rukmini. He hid it in a stepwell, known as Savitri vav, during the Muslim invasion, before moving it to Ladva village. In 1551, when Turk Aziz invaded Dwarka, the idol was shifted to the island of Bet Dwarka.

Dwarka, along with the Okhamandal region, was under the rule of Gaekwad of Baroda state during the Indian rebellion of 1857. A war broke out at Okhamandal in 1858 between the local Vaghers and the British. The Vaghers had won the battle and ruled until September 1859. Later, after a joint offensive of the British, the Gaekwads, and other princely state troops, the Vaghers were ousted in 1859. During these operations, led by Colonel Donovan, the temples at Dwarka and Bet Dwarka suffered damage and were looted. A complaint of atrocities by the British was made by the local people of Jamnagar, Porbander, and Kutch, which led to their restoration. In 1861, Dwarakadheesh Temple was renovated by Maharaja Khanderao and the British, who refurbished the shikara. Maharaja Gaikwad of Baroda added a golden pinnacle to the shikara in 1958 during a refurbishment by Shankaracharya of Dwarka. Since 1960, the temple has been maintained by the Government of India.

The Sudama Setu, a bridge over the Gomti River connecting mainland Dwarka with Panchkui island was opened in 2016.

Geography and climate

Geography
Dwarka, at the mouth of the Gulf of Kutch, on the western shore of the Okhamandal Peninsula, is on the right bank of the Gomti River which rises from the Bhavda village at a place known as Mul-Gomti,  to the east. It is now under the newly formed district of Devbhoomi Dwarka at the western end of the Saurashtra (Kathiawar) peninsula, facing the Arabian Sea. The Gomti River was a harbor until the 19th century.

Climate
According to the Köppen-Geiger classification, Dwarka has a subtropical desert/low-latitude arid hot climate. The Holdridge life zones system of bio-climatic classification identifies Dwarka in or near the subtropical thorn woodland biome.

Demographics

As of the 2011 Census of India, Dwarka had a population of 38873 (as per Census 2011, the population reported is 38,873). Males constitute 20,306 of the population, and females constitute 18,567. Dwarka has an average literacy rate of 75.94%, lower than the national average of 78.03%; the male literacy rate is 83%, and the female literacy rate is 68.27%. 11.98% of the population is under six years of age.

Economy

Most of the revenue of Dwarka is derived from tourism, due to it being a site for pilgrims. It is a producer of agricultural produce such as millets, ghee (clarified butter), oilseeds, and salt, which are transported from its port. A wind farm power generation of 39.2 MW, operated near Dwarka by the AES Saurashtra Windfarms Pvt Ltd (ASW), is now run by Tata Power Renewable Energy Ltd (TPREL). Dwarka's industrial activity mainly centres around cement production. Sharda Peeth Vidya Sabha is an educational society sponsored by the Sharda Peeth, Dwarka which runs an arts college in Dwarka.

Landmarks

Temples

Considered a holy city, Dwarka is well known for its temples and as a pilgrimage centre for Hindus. The Dwarakadhisa Temple, also called Jagat Mandir, located in the heart of Dwarka, is a Vaishnava temple. It was built by Raja Jagat Singh Rathore, hence it is called Jagat Mandir. It is conjectured that this temple location is 2,500 years old and is where Krishna built his city and a temple. However, the existing temple is dated to the 16th century. It is a five-storied edifice built over 72 pillars (a sandstone temple with 60 pillars is also mentioned). The temple layout consists of a garbhagriha (Nijamandira or Harigraha) and an antarala (an antechamber). The main deity deified in the sanctum is Dwarkadeesh, which is known as the Trivikrama form of Vishnu and is depicted with four arms.

The Dwarakadhisa Temple is also the location of Dvaraka Pitha, also called Sharada Matha/Peeth and "western peeth"), one of the four peeths (Sanskrit: "religious center") established by Adi Shankaracharya.

Gomti Ghat consists of steps leading to the Gomti River, which is also a holy place for pilgrims to take a dip in the river, before visiting Dwarakadish temple. The ghat has a number of small shrines dedicated to the Samudra (God of the Sea), Saraswati and Lakshmi. Other notable temples in the ghat area include the Samudra Narayana (Sangam Narayana) temple, which is at the confluence of the Gomti River with the sea, the Chakra Narayana temple where there is a stone with an imprint of a chakra as a manifestation of Vishnu, and the Gomati temple, which has an idol of the river goddess Gomati that is said to have been brought to earth by the sage Vasishta.

The temple is said to be 2,500 years old, but in its present form it is estimated to belong to the 12th century. It is a richly carved temple decorated with sculptures of gods and goddesses on the exterior with the sanctum housing the main image of Rukmini. Carved naratharas (human figures) and carved gajatharas (elephants) are depicted in panels at the base of the tower.

Letitia Elizabeth Landon's poetical illustration , to an engraving of William Purser's painting shown above (painting of the late 1820s), says little of the temples themselves but does advocate and praise religious tolerance. It was published in Fisher's Drawing Room Scrap Book, 1837.

Nagesvara Jyotirlinga
Ancient Shiva temple, Nagesvara Jyortirlinga, one of the 12 Jyotirlingas and only 16 Km from Dwarkadhish Temple.

Lighthouse and lake

There is a lighthouse at the Dwarka Point on the Dwarka peninsula, which provides a panoramic view of the city. The radio beacon provided on this lighthouse tower is powered by a solar photovoltaic module.

There is a lake or tank called Gopi Talab in the western part of the city.

A similar lake known for Gopi Chandan, meaning "sandal paste from Gopi", is situated in Bet Dwarka; this mud is found in the bed of the lake. This fragrant mud is applied as a sanctity symbol by devout Hindus on their forehead.

Bet Dwarka

Bet Dwarka, an island in the Arabian sea off the coast of Dwarka. Considered the original residence of Krishna, Bet Dwarka was the old port during the ancient times of Krishna before the Okha port was developed in Dwarka. The temple built here is credited to the religious Guru Vallabhacharya of the "Pushtimarg Sampradaya". Rice is the traditional offering here to the deity as it is believed that Sudama offered rice to his childhood friend Krishna. There are also smaller shrines on Bet Dwarka which are dedicated to Shiva, Vishnu, Hanuman and Devi. According to a legend, Vishnu killed the demon Shankhasura on this island. There are temples of Vishnu in the incarnation of matsya, or fish. Other shrines here are of Rukmini, Trivikrama, Devaki, Radha, Lakshmi, Satyabhama, Jambavati, Lakshmi Narayan, and many other gods.

The temple is deified with many images of Hanuman and his son Makardhwaja. The legend associated with the birth of a son to Hanuman, who is considered celibate, is that the sweat of Hanuman was consumed by a crocodile which then gave birth to a son named Makardhwaja. The Jethwa Rajput clan of Kshatriyas claim their descent from Makardhwaja.

Nageshvara Jyotirlinga Mandir is a temple dedicated to Shiva, and one of the twelve Jyotirlingas (meaning radiant sign of The Almighty) is deified here in a subterranean cell.

Shivrajpur Beach 

Shivrajpur Beach is 14.5 km from Dwarka Railway Station and is among eight Indian beaches to get the prestigious Blue Flag beach certification.

Culture and sports

Culture

Janmashtami is the main festival that is celebrated during the months of August and September with great fervor and piety as it is believed to be the abode of Lord Krishna in prehistoric times. The festival is marked by several night long celebrations to mark the birth of Krishna. Bhajans and sermons are part of the festivities. At midnight there is reenactment of Krishna's childhood in the form of Garba and Raas dances. On this occasion, the local boys create a pyramid and a young boy in the costume of Krishna climbs up this pyramid to strike a pot holding butter, an act which Krishna had mischievously performed with the gopis. This is also known as "Dahi Handi" or Utlotsavam.

Sharda Peeth Vidya Sabha is an educational society sponsored by the Sharda Peeth, which runs an arts college in Dwarka. The city is also home to the N.D.H. High School and P.V.M Girls' High School.

Sports
The underwater ancient city off the coast of Bet Dwarka has been proposed to be developed as a scuba diving site. This is believed to be the first effort anywhere in the world to utilise a submerged city for tourism. Water and beach sports are also being promoted by the state government, and there are proposals to further promote aero and submarine sports.

Transportation

Train 

Air 
Nearest Airport is Jamnagar Airport at 131 kms

Road 

Notes

See Also 

 Nageshvara Jyotirlinga
 Somnath Temple

References

Bibliography

External links

 Dwarkadhish.org Official website of Jagad Mandir Dwarka
 

Archaeological sites in Gujarat
Cities and towns in Devbhoomi Dwarka district
Former capital cities in India
Hindu holy cities
Hindu pilgrimage sites in India
Indus Valley civilisation sites
Krishna
Locations in Hindu mythology
Mahabharata
Underwater ruins
Char Dham temples
Vedic period
Religious tourism
Religious tourism in India
Hindu pilgrimage sites
Hindu pilgrimages